Mucke or Mücke or Muecke is a German surname. Notable people with the surname include:

 Elli Mücke (born 1981), German singer
 Ernst Mucke (Sorbian Arnošt Muka; 1854–1932), Sorbian scholar and writer
 Hermann Mucke (bioscientist) (born 1955), Austrian bioscientist and consultant
 Hermann Mucke (astronomer) (1935–2019), Austrian astronomer and public educator
 Manuela Mucke (born 1975), German sprint canoer
 Stefan Mücke (born 1981), German racing driver
 Carl Muecke (editor) (1815–1898), German-born clergyman, scientist, and newspaperman in South Australia
 Charles Andrew Muecke (1918–2007), US federal judge
 Hugo Carl Emil Muecke (1842–1929), Australian politician, son of Carl
 Jonathan Muecke (born 1983), American architect
 Stephen Muecke, Australian linguist
 Tom Muecke (born 1963), American football player
 Hellmuth von Mücke, officer of the Kaiserliche Marine

German-language surnames
Surnames from nicknames